The Television of the Republic of Indonesia Tower  (or Menara TVRI ) is a 144-meter high television transmitter tower located in Jakarta, Indonesia. Started construction on 1 April 1975 and completed on 24 August 1977, this tower was at one time one of the tallest structures in Jakarta and Indonesia.

History 
Since its establishment on 17 August 1962, TVRI broadcasts in Jakarta and its surroundings have been emitted from an 85-meter high iron antenna located near the current position of the tower,  which was funded from Japanese war reparations and built by Nippon Electric Company.

The construction of a transmitter tower had been planned since May 1, 1972 as part of the construction of a television station complex which was carried out to suit the surrounding environment which included the Parliament Complex of the Republic of Indonesia and the Gelora Bung Karno Stadium. Construction will start on 1 April 1975 by Joint venture Indonesia-Japan P.T. Waskita, and  Kajima.

The tower was completed on 24 August 1977 and started functioning in 1978. The tower was inaugurated on 24 August 1982 along with the new studio building.

See also 
 Fernsehturm Stuttgart
 List of tallest towers in the world
 List of transmission sites

References

External links 
 TVRI Tower, Jakarta - SkyscraperPage.com

TVRI
Towers in Indonesia
Buildings and structures in Jakarta
Towers completed in 1977
Towers with revolving restaurants
1982 establishments in Indonesia
Radio masts and towers